Tripolia Gate is a massive arched gateway in west Ajmer, having a pillared hall in the left side which was to be used by the guards. The gate was constructed by Emperor Akbar of the Mughal Empire in 1570 AD.  The monument is under the Archaeological Survey of India.

See also 

 Tripolia Gates

References  

Buildings and structures in Ajmer
Buildings and structures in Ajmer district
Akbar